Ripspeed is a sub brand of Halfords, one of the leading automotive parts retailer in the United Kingdom. It began as
an independent retailer in the 1970s, two decades later the business changed hands and was purchased in 1999 by Halfords, and operates as one of the five subsections of a store if it is present.

History
Keith Ripp (1947–2020), the 1981, 82 and 83 hat-trick British Rallycross Champion with Ford Fiesta 1600, started in a small shop in Pinner green before moving to Hertford Road, Enfield Wash specialising in tuning parts and accessories for Minis as Ripspeed International in 1973

The motorsport and road car tuning and accessories side progressively grew over the years. By the 1990s, Ripspeed's main rivals were Demon Tweeks and Grand Prix Racewear, both owned by racing drivers, Alan Minshaw and Ray Bellm respectively. In 1996, Ripp sold Ripspeed to Tony Joseph. He then relocated the store from its original premises to a large one on Fore Street, Edmonton, London.  with a plan for expansion in other areas. In turn Ripspeed relocated for a second time to an industrial estate in Enfield but this plan came to an abrupt end when the company collapsed due to financial problems after two years of ownership.

Ripp with his two sons Adrian and Jason later started up Xtreme Motorsport, based in Harlow, Essex, which in turn was sold off in 2001. The Ripp brothers later founded R-Tec Auto Design, based in St Albans, Hertfordshire.

In early 1999, Halfords took over the brand. One of the biggest changes was discarding the motorsport retail side of its business to concentrate on the lucrative boy racer market.

Ripspeed itself has had only a limited number of demonstration cars out and about at shows and events. It started with a 1999 Vauxhall Corsa C SXI, which was followed in 1999 with a Ford Focus Ripspeed's current project is a 1991 Nissan 200SX turbo which is a drift car project and has been seen in action at Santa Pod raceway in 2007. These cars are used extensively for promoting the Ripspeed brand at car shows across the UK and at store openings or promotion weekends.

Ripspeed itself did sponsor the Doncaster Performance and Custom Car Show, which begins the UK outdoor car show season. The event was renamed Ripspeed Donny.

They have since moved on to sponsor numerous events at Santa Pod raceway which included shows such as "The Jap Show" and "USC" (Ultimate Street Car).

References

See also
Keith Ripp Obituary (1947-2020)
Keith Ripp
Halfords homepage
Ripspeed area of Halfords homepage

Automotive motorsports and performance companies
Automotive part retailers
Retail companies established in 1973
Retail companies disestablished in 1998
Store brands
British companies established in 1973